is a Japanese tennis player.

Shimizu has a career-high singles ranking of 175 by the Women's Tennis Association (WTA), achieved in May 2019, and a best WTA doubles ranking of 145, set in October 2018. Shimizu has won six singles and eight doubles titles on the ITF Women's Circuit.

She won her biggest title to date at the 2018 Kurume Cup, defeating Abbie Myers in the final.

ITF Circuit finals

Singles: 8 (6 titles, 2 runner–ups)

Doubles: 12 (8 titles, 4 runner–ups)

References

External links
 
 

1998 births
Living people
People from Maebashi
Japanese female tennis players
21st-century Japanese women